is a professional Japanese baseball player.

External links

 NPB.com

1988 births
Living people
People from Sōka
Japanese baseball players
Nippon Professional Baseball pitchers
Tokyo Yakult Swallows players
Hokkaido Nippon-Ham Fighters players
21st-century Japanese people